Universidad APEC (Universidad Acción Pro-Educación y Cultura) (UNAPEC) is a private university located in Santo Domingo, Dominican Republic. It was founded in 1965 under the name of Instituto de Estudios Superiores (Institute of Higher Studies). Management, Spanish and Bilingual Executive Secretarial Science, and Accounting, were the first majors offered by this university.

In 1968, the government of the Dominican Republic granted APEC accreditation as a university with the right to award higher education degrees. The university changed its name to the current one (Universidad APEC) on August 11, 1983; such change having been approved by the Dominican government in 1985.

University's Board of Trustees
Roberto Rodríguez Estrella-President
Antonio Alma Iglesias- Vice-president
Cristina Aguiar - Secretary
Pedro Pablo Cabral - Treasurer
Dr. Franklyn Holguín Haché - Ex Officio Director

Schools and Colleges

Accounting
Arts and Communication
Computer Science
Economic and Entrepreneurial Sciences
Engineering and Technology
Languages
Law
Management
Marketing
Tourism

External links 
Universidad APEC website
Dominican Republic Student & University Guide

Universities in the Dominican Republic
Education in Santo Domingo
Educational institutions established in 1965
1965 establishments in the Dominican Republic